Noel Christina Frame (born March 26, 1980) is an American politician of the Democratic Party. She is a member of the Washington Senate, representing the 36th district. She previously served in the Washington House of Representatives, representing the same district.

References

External links

1980 births
Living people
Democratic Party members of the Washington House of Representatives
Women state legislators in Washington (state)
21st-century American politicians
21st-century American women politicians